Ephysius of Sardinia (250?–303?) is a Christian martyr. Nothing is known of his life, except his martyrdom. He is the patron of Cagliari, a commune in Sardinia. He is especially revered in the city, although his relics lie in Pisa.

References

Sources

Ante-Nicene Christian martyrs